Charles Hartung (February 19, 1841 – July 17, 1916) was mayor of Green Bay, Wisconsin.

Biography
Hartung was born on February 19, 1841, in Germany. He moved with his family to the United States when he was thirteen years old, settling in Two Rivers, Wisconsin. During the American Civil War, he enlisted in the 5th Wisconsin Volunteer Infantry Regiment of the Union Army. After a furlough due to a serious wound suffered during the Battle of Williamsburg, he returned to combat as an officer and became part of the Army of the Potomac. He achieved the rank of captain. Following the war, he moved to Green Bay. Hartung married Madalene Bader in 1866. They would have four children. He died at his home in Green Bay on July 17, 1916.

Political career
Hartung was mayor from 1885 to 1887. Additionally, he was an alderman for seven years. Twenty-three years after his term as an alderman expired, he was elected to the city council and served eight more years.

References

External links
 

German emigrants to the United States
People from Two Rivers, Wisconsin
Mayors of Green Bay, Wisconsin
Wisconsin city council members
People of Wisconsin in the American Civil War
Union Army officers
Union Army soldiers
1841 births
1916 deaths
19th-century American politicians